Illinizas Ecological Reserve (sometimes referred to as Illinizas National Park) is a protected area in Ecuador, located in the provinces of Cotopaxi and Pichincha.  The reserve consists of 149,900 hectares, and lies 55 kilometers south of Quito.

Geography of Cotopaxi Province
Nature reserves in Ecuador
Geography of Pichincha Province
Tourist attractions in Pichincha Province
Tourist attractions in Cotopaxi Province